Crum Creek, also known as Cathatachua Creek, is a river in Herkimer County in the state of New York. It begins north of Little Falls and flows in a generally southeast direction before flowing into the Mohawk River in the hamlet of East Creek.

References 

Rivers of Montgomery County, New York
Mohawk River
Rivers of New York (state)